The 2022–23 Meralco Bolts season is the 12th season of the franchise in the Philippine Basketball Association (PBA).

Key dates
May 15: The PBA Season 47 draft was held at the Robinsons Place Manila in Manila.
June 6: After Norman Black files leave for personal reasons, Luigi Trillo acted as standing-in head coach and won his first game against the Elasto Painters.
July 31: The Bolts won against the Gin Kings for the first time in a playoff series.
August 5: Norman Black returned to the sidelines, as he led the Bolts to tie the semifinals series (1–1) against the San Miguel Beermen.

Draft picks

Roster

Philippine Cup

Eliminations

Standings

Game log

|-bgcolor=ccffcc
| 1
| June 11
| Phoenix
| W 109–98
| Chris Newsome (21)
| Cliff Hodge (10)
| Chris Newsome (7)
| Ynares Center
| 1–0
|-bgcolor=ccffcc
| 2
| June 16
| Converge
| W 90–74
| Aaron Black (25)
| Raymond Almazan (15)
| Black, Newsome (5)
| Ynares Center
| 2–0
|-bgcolor=ffcccc
| 3
| June 18
| TNT
| L 71–78
| Allein Maliksi (20)
| Cliff Hodge (9)
| Bong Quinto (4)
| Ynares Center
| 2–1
|-bgcolor=ccffcc
| 4
| June 23
| NorthPort
| W 97–87
| Aaron Black (20)
| Raymar Jose (13)
| Black, Newsome (7)
| Ynares Center
| 3–1
|-bgcolor=ffcccc
| 5
| June 25
| NLEX
| L 75–90
| Chris Newsome (17)
| Raymar Jose (9)
| Banchero, Newsome (3)
| Ynares Center
| 3–2
|-bgcolor=ffcccc
| 6
| June 30
| Blackwater
| L 89–90
| Chris Newsome (23)
| Cliff Hodge (7)
| Bong Quinto (8)
| Smart Araneta Coliseum
| 3–3

|-bgcolor=ccffcc
| 7
| July 6
| Rain or Shine
| W 77–73
| Aaron Black (20)
| Raymond Almazan (15)
| Aaron Black (6)
| Smart Araneta Coliseum
| 4–3
|-bgcolor=ccffcc
| 8
| July 13
| Barangay Ginebra
| W 90–73
| Chris Newsome (19)
| Raymond Almazan (15)
| Black, Quinto (5)
| Smart Araneta Coliseum
| 5–3
|-bgcolor=ffcccc
| 9
| July 15
| Magnolia
| L 88–97 (OT)
| Chris Newsome (24)
| Raymond Almazan (18)
| Aaron Black (7)
| Ynares Center
| 5–4
|-bgcolor=ccffcc
| 10
| July 17
| San Miguel
| W 89–86
| Allein Maliksi (18)
| Cliff Hodge (11)
| Black, Hodge, Newsome (5)
| Smart Araneta Coliseum
| 6–4
|-bgcolor=ccffcc
| 11
| July 21
| Terrafirma
| W 105–89
| Chris Newsome (19)
| Raymond Almazan (9)
| Banchero, Black, Newsome (5)
| Smart Araneta Coliseum
| 7–4

Playoffs

Bracket

Game log

|-bgcolor=ccffcc
| 1
| July 24
| Barangay Ginebra
| W 93–82
| Aaron Black (25)
| Newsome, Pascual (9)
| Chris Newsome (6)
| Smart Araneta Coliseum
| 1–0
|-bgcolor=ffcccc
| 2
| July 29
| Barangay Ginebra
| L 87–94
| Cliff Hodge (25)
| Raymond Almazan (10)
| Chris Newsome (6)
| Filoil EcoOil Centre
| 1–1
|-bgcolor=ccffcc
| 3
| July 31
| Barangay Ginebra
| W 106–104
| Chris Newsome (21)
| Cliff Hodge (18)
| Chris Newsome (12)
| SM Mall of Asia Arena
| 2–1

|-bgcolor=ffcccc
| 1
| August 3
| San Miguel
| L 97–121
| Chris Banchero (17)
| Almazan, Jose, Newsome, Quinto (6)
| Chris Banchero (5)
| Smart Araneta Coliseum
| 0–1
|-bgcolor=ccffcc
| 2
| August 5
| San Miguel
| W 99–88
| Cliff Hodge (17)
| Cliff Hodge (14)
| Chris Newsome (5)
| Smart Araneta Coliseum
| 1–1
|-bgcolor=ffcccc
| 3
| August 7
| San Miguel
| L 91–96
| Chris Newsome (16)
| Cliff Hodge (13)
| Chris Newsome (6)
| Smart Araneta Coliseum
| 1–2
|-bgcolor=ccffcc
| 4
| August 10
| San Miguel
| W 111–97
| Aaron Black (21)
| Black, Hodge (7)
| Aaron Black (7)
| Smart Araneta Coliseum
| 2–2
|-bgcolor=ffcccc
| 5
| August 12
| San Miguel
| L 78–89
| Chris Newsome (24)
| Aaron Black (11)
| Black, Newsome (4)
| Smart Araneta Coliseum
| 2–3
|-bgcolor=ccffcc
| 6
| August 14
| San Miguel
| W 96–92
| Chris Newsome (19)
| Cliff Hodge (12)
| Aaron Black (6)
| Smart Araneta Coliseum9,439
| 3–3
|-bgcolor=ffcccc
| 7
| August 17
| San Miguel
| L 89–100
| Cliff Hodge (23)
| Cliff Hodge (8)
| Banchero, Hodge, Newsome (4)
| Smart Araneta Coliseum
| 3–4

Commissioner's Cup

Eliminations

Standings

Game log

|-bgcolor=ffcccc
| 1
| September 30, 2022
| NorthPort
| L 95–101 (OT)
| Johnny O'Bryant III (30)
| Johnny O'Bryant III (22)
| Aaron Black (7)
| Smart Araneta Coliseum
| 0–1

|-bgcolor=ffcccc
| 2
| October 2, 2022
| Barangay Ginebra
| L 91–99
| Johnny O'Bryant III (31)
| Johnny O'Bryant III (16)
| Aaron Black (9)
| Smart Araneta Coliseum
| 0–2
|-bgcolor=ccffcc
| 3
| October 7, 2022
| Terrafirma
| W 105–92
| Johnny O'Bryant III (31)
| Johnny O'Bryant III (11)
| Chris Banchero (7)
| Smart Araneta Coliseum
| 1–2
|-bgcolor=ffcccc
| 4
| October 15, 2022
| Converge
| L 99–106
| Johnny O'Bryant III (27)
| Johnny O'Bryant III (15)
| Aaron Black (6)
| Smart Araneta Coliseum
| 1–3
|-bgcolor=ffcccc
| 5
| October 19, 2022
| Phoenix
| L 82–89
| Bong Quinto (22)
| Johnny O'Bryant III (16)
| Johnny O'Bryant III (9)
| PhilSports Arena
| 1–4
|-bgcolor=ffcccc
| 6
| October 22, 2022
| Rain or Shine
| L 96–113
| Johnny O'Bryant III (30)
| Raymond Almazan (12)
| Black, O'Bryant (5)
| PhilSports Arena
| 1–5

|-bgcolor=ccffcc
| 7
| November 4, 2022
| Bay Area
| W 92–89
| K. J. McDaniels (31)
| Raymond Almazan (16)
| Banchero, Black (2)
| Smart Araneta Coliseum
| 2–5
|-bgcolor=ccffcc
| 8
| November 11, 2022
| Blackwater
| W 102–98 (OT)
| K. J. McDaniels (26)
| K. J. McDaniels (16)
| K. J. McDaniels (5)
| Ynares Center
| 3–5
|-bgcolor=ccffcc
| 9
| November 16, 2022
| TNT
| W 97–91
| K. J. McDaniels (26)
| K. J. McDaniels (15)
| Aaron Black (6)
| Smart Araneta Coliseum
| 4–5
|-bgcolor=ffcccc
| 10
| November 27, 2022
| Magnolia
| L 96–108
| K. J. McDaniels (32)
| K. J. McDaniels (9)
| Chris Banchero (5)
| PhilSports Arena
| 4–6
|-bgcolor=ffcccc
| 11
| November 30, 2022
| NLEX
| L 81–92
| K. J. McDaniels (22)
| Hodge, McDaniels (9)
| Aaron Black (4)
| PhilSports Arena
| 4–7

|-bgcolor=ffcccc
| 12
| December 2, 2022
| San Miguel
| L 108–113
| K. J. McDaniels (27)
| Raymar Jose (17)
| Anjo Caram (6)
| PhilSports Arena
| 4–8

Governors' Cup

Eliminations

Standings

Game log

|-bgcolor=ccffcc
| 1
| January 22
| Rain or Shine
| W 105–87
| K. J. McDaniels (27)
| K. J. McDaniels (23)
| Chris Newsome (6)
| PhilSports Arena
| 1–0
|-bgcolor=ccffcc
| 2
| January 26
| NorthPort
| W 107–102 
| K. J. McDaniels (32)
| K. J. McDaniels (22)
| Chris Newsome (6)
| PhilSports Arena
| 2–0
|-bgcolor=ffcccc
| 3
| January 28
| Terrafirma
| L 88–96
| K. J. McDaniels (29)
| K. J. McDaniels (19)
| Black, McDaniels (4)
| Ynares Center
| 2–1

|-bgcolor=ccffcc
| 4
| February 4
| Blackwater
| W 125–99
| Allein Maliksi (30)
| K. J. McDaniels (15)
| K. J. McDaniels (8)
| Ynares Center
| 3–1
|-bgcolor=ffcccc
| 5
| February 9
| San Miguel
| L 86–94
| McDaniels, Newsome (18)
| K. J. McDaniels (13)
| Chris Newsome (5)
| Smart Araneta Coliseum
| 3–2
|-bgcolor=ffcccc
| 6
| February 17
| TNT
| L 104–111 
| K. J. McDaniels (26)
| K. J. McDaniels (15)
| Chris Newsome (4)
| Smart Araneta Coliseum
| 3–3
|-bgcolor=ccffcc
| 7
| February 23
| NLEX
| W 114–98
| K. J. McDaniels (31)
| K. J. McDaniels (21) 
| Chris Newsome (8)
| PhilSports Arena
| 4–3
|-bgcolor=ccffcc
| 8
| February 26
| Magnolia
| W 86–84
| K. J. McDaniels (19)
| K. J. McDaniels (15)  
| Aaron Black (4)
| Smart Araneta Coliseum
| 5–3

|-bgcolor=ffcccc
| 9
| March 1
| Barangay Ginebra
| L 107–112 
| K. J. McDaniels (28)
| K. J. McDaniels (11)
| Banchero, Black (5)
| Smart Araneta Coliseum
| 5–4
|-bgcolor=ccffcc
| 10
| March 3
| Converge
| W 132–129 (OT)
| K. J. McDaniels (33)
| K. J. McDaniels (12) 
| Black, Hodge (5)
| Smart Araneta Coliseum
| 6–4
|-bgcolor=ccffcc
| 11
| March 5
| Phoenix
| W 92–86 
| K. J. McDaniels (19)
| K. J. McDaniels (16) 
| Chris Newsome (9)
| PhilSports Arena
| 7–4

Playoffs

Bracket

Transactions

Free agency

Signings

Recruited imports

References

Meralco Bolts seasons
Meralco Bolts